Mona Shores Public Schools is a public school district located in Michigan, United States, in the western side of the state near Lake Michigan. The district includes most of the city of Norton Shores, which is just south of Muskegon, and the city of Roosevelt Park.

History

The district was formed in 1959, when the residents of the existing districts of Churchill, Hile, Lincoln, Maple Grove, and Mona Beach (all K-8 districts) voted to unite into a single K-12 district.

Schools
Mona Shores Public Schools manages six schools.

Mona Shores High School
Mona Shores Middle School 
Campbell Elementary School 
Churchill Elementary School 
Lincoln Park Elementary School 
Ross Park Elementary School

See also
List of school districts in Michigan

References

External links
Mona Shores Public Schools

School districts in Michigan
Education in Muskegon County, Michigan
1959 establishments in Michigan
School districts established in 1959